Ernst Erich Buder (1896–1962) was a German composer. He worked on around forty film scores during his career.

Selected filmography
 Circus Life (1931)
 The Other Side (1931)
 Student Life in Merry Springtime (1931)
 Night Convoy (1932)
 Tannenberg (1932)
 Refugees (1933)
 Marriage Strike (1935)
 Happy Days in Aranjuez (1936)
 Autobus S (1937)
 Love Can Lie (1937)
 Urlaub auf Ehrenwort (1938)

References

Bibliography
 Giesen, Rolf. Nazi Propaganda Films: A History and Filmography. McFarland, 2003.

External links

1896 births
1962 deaths
People from Cottbus
People from the Province of Brandenburg
Nazi Party members
German composers